Daniel Robert Hokanson (born June 27, 1963) is a four-star general in the United States Army who currently serves as the 29th chief of the National Guard Bureau. He previously served as the 21st director of the Army National Guard. His previous military assignments include serving as vice chief of the National Guard Bureau, deputy commander of United States Northern Command, adjutant general of the Oregon National Guard, and commander of the 41st Infantry Brigade Combat Team. He is a veteran of Operation Iraqi Freedom, Operation Enduring Freedom, and Operation Just Cause. Hokanson assumed his current assignment on August 3, 2020.

Early life
Daniel Robert Hokanson was born in Happy Camp, California on June 27, 1963, the son of Bob and Diann (Kieffer) Hokanson. He graduated from Happy Camp High School in 1980, and attended the College of the Siskiyous before being accepted to the United States Military Academy at West Point, New York.

Military career
Hokanson graduated from West Point in 1986 and was commissioned as a second lieutenant in the Aviation branch.  During his time at West Point and the period immediately afterwards he completed: Level C Survival, Evasion, Resistance and Escape (SERE) Course; Aviation Officer Basic Course; Air Assault School; and Initial Entry Rotary Wing Flight Training (Aeroscout). He is also a graduate of the United States Army Airborne School.

Hokanson then served for several years as an aviator with the 7th Infantry Division at Fort Ord, California, including deployment to Panama for Operation Just Cause in 1989–90. In 1991 he completed the Aviation Officer Advanced Course and AH-64 (Apache) Combat Aircraft Qualification Course.  He subsequently served with 1st Battalion, 229th Aviation Regiment at Fort Hood, including command of the battalion's Company B, and then served as a  project engineer for the Aircraft Armament Test Division at Yuma Proving Ground in Arizona.

Army National Guard
Hokanson left the Regular Army in July 1995 and was a member of the Army Reserve Control Group until October.

Hokanson then began his career as a member of the Army National Guard, assigned initially as aide-de-camp in the office of Oregon's adjutant general.  His later assignments included: operations officer, 641st Medical Battalion (Helicopter Evacuation); aviation operations officer, Oregon Army National Guard; plans analyst, Program Analysis and Evaluation Division, National Guard Bureau; executive officer, 641st Medical Battalion (Evacuation Helicopter), Oregon Army National Guard; deputy director, Army Aviation, Oregon Army National Guard; commander, 641st Medical Battalion (Helicopter Evacuation), Oregon Army National Guard; chief of staff, Combined Joint Task Force Phoenix V, Afghanistan; deputy commander, 41st Infantry Brigade Combat Team, Oregon Army National Guard; and commander, 41st Infantry Brigade Combat Team, including deployment as part of Multi-National Corps – Iraq.

General officer

In 2010 Hokanson was promoted to brigadier general. His assignments as a general officer included: deputy director, Strategic Plans and Policy (J-5), North American Aerospace Defense Command and United States Northern Command; and director, Strategic Plans and Policy (J-5), National Guard Bureau. Hokanson was promoted to major general in May 2013. From August 2013 to July 2015 he served as adjutant general of the Oregon Military Department.

In June 2015, Hokanson was nominated by the president, for appointment to the rank of lieutenant general in the reserve active-duty, while serving as the deputy commander of United States Northern Command and as vice commander of U.S. Element, North American Aerospace Defense Command, at Peterson Air Force Base, Colorado.

Hokanson's nomination for appointment as the 11th vice chief of the National Guard Bureau was confirmed by the United States Senate on September 15, 2016. He assumed office in November 2016.

Director of the Army National Guard
In March 2019, the president nominated Hokanson to succeed Timothy J. Kadavy as director of the Army National Guard. Hokanson assumed his new duties in a ceremony on June 21, 2019. In June 2020, the adjutant general of Minnesota, Jon A. Jensen was nominated to succeed him as Army Guard director.

Chief of the National Guard Bureau
In May 2020, Hokanson was nominated for appointment to the rank of general and assignment as the chief of the National Guard Bureau. He was confirmed by the Senate on July 20, 2020 and assumed office on August 3, 2020.

Awards and decorations

Assignments

July 1986 – July 1987, Student, Survival, Evasion, Resistance and Escape (Level C – Fort Bragg); Aviation Officer Basic Course; Air Assault School; Initial Entry Rotary Wing Flight Training (Aeroscout); Fort Rucker, Alabama 
July 1987 – March 1988, Executive Officer, Troop B, 2nd Squadron (RECON), 9th Cavalry, 7th Infantry Division (LIGHT), Fort Ord, California
March 1988 – May 1989, Scout Platoon Leader, Troop B, 2nd Squadron (RECON), 9th Cavalry, 7th Infantry Division (LIGHT), Fort Ord, California and the Republic of Panama
May 1989 – August 1990, Flight Operations Officer and 3rd Infantry Brigade Aviation Liaison Officer, 2nd Squadron (RECON), 9th Cavalry, 7th Infantry Division (LIGHT), Fort Ord, California and the Republic of Panama
October 1990 – June 1991, Student, Aviation Officer Advanced Course and AH-64 Combat Aircraft Qualification Course, Fort Rucker, Alabama
June 1991 – October 1992, Assistant S3, 1st Battalion, 229th Aviation Regiment (Attack), Apache Training Brigade, Fort Hood, Texas
October 1992 – June 1994, Commander, Company B, 1st Battalion, 229th Aviation Regiment (Attack), XVIII Airborne Corps, Fort Bragg, North Carolina
June 1994 – April 1995 Project Engineer, Aircraft Armament Test Division, Yuma Proving Ground, Arizona
July 1995 – October 1995, Army Reserve Control Group (Ready Reserve)
October 1995 – September 1996, Aide-de-Camp, Office of The Adjutant General, Oregon National Guard, Salem, Oregon
October 1996 – September 1997, Operations Officer, 641st Medical Battalion (EVAC), Oregon Army National Guard, Salem, Oregon
October 1997 – December 1998, Aviation Operations Officer, Oregon Army National Guard, Salem, Oregon
December 1998 – June 1999, Student, Naval Postgraduate School, Monterey, California
July 1999 – July 2000, Plans Analyst, Program Analysis and Evaluation Division, National Guard Bureau, Arlington, Virginia
July 2000 – June 2001, Student, College of Naval Command and Staff, Naval War College, Newport, Rhode Island
June 2001 – June 2002, Executive Officer, 641st Medical Battalion (EVAC), Oregon Army National Guard, Salem, Oregon 
June 2002 – June 2004, Deputy Director, Army Aviation, Headquarters State Area Command, Oregon Army National Guard, Salem, Oregon
July 2004 – June 2005, Commander, 641st Medical Battalion (EVAC), Oregon Army National Guard, Salem, Oregon
July 2005 – July 2006, Student, Senior Service College Fellowship, Harvard University, Cambridge, Massachusetts
August 2006 – July 2007, Chief of Staff, Combined Joint Task Force Phoenix V, Afghanistan 
July 2007 – March 2008, Deputy Commander, 41st Infantry Brigade Combat Team, Oregon Army National Guard, Portland, Oregon
March 2008 – July 2010, Commander, 41st Infantry Brigade Combat Team, Multi-National Corps – Iraq, and Oregon Army National Guard, Portland, Oregon 
August 2010 – August 2012, Deputy Director, J5, North American Aerospace Defense Command and United States Northern Command, Peterson Air Force Base, Colorado
August 2012 – July 2013, Director, Strategic Plans and Policy (J-5), National Guard Bureau, Arlington, Virginia
August 2013 – July 2015, The Adjutant General, Oregon, Joint Force Headquarters, Oregon National Guard, Salem, Oregon
August 2015 – September 2016, Deputy Commander, U.S. Northern Command, Peterson Air Force Base, Colorado
September 2016 – June 2019, Vice Chief of the National Guard Bureau, Arlington, Virginia
June 2019 – August 2020, Director of the Army National Guard, Arlington, Virginia
August 2020 – present, Chief, National Guard Bureau, the Pentagon, Arlington, Virginia

Education
Hokanson is a 1986 graduate of the United States Military Academy, and received a Bachelor of Science degree in mechanical engineering (aerospace).

In 2000 he completed a Master of Arts in international security and civil-military relations at the Naval Postgraduate School.  In 2001 he graduated from the Naval War College with a master of arts in national security and strategic studies.  Hokanson completed the Senior Service College National Security Fellowship Program at Harvard University's John F. Kennedy School of Government in 2006.  In 2011 he completed the CAPSTONE leadership course at the National Defense University.

Aviation qualifications
In addition to completion of the Aviation Officer Basic and Advanced Courses and Initial Entry Rotary Wing Flight Training (Aeroscout), Hokanson's aviation qualifications include:

Rating: Command Pilot
Flight Hours: More than 2600 (over 50 combat hours)
Aircraft Flown: AH-64, OH-58, TH-55, UH-1, UH-60
Pilot wings from: Fort Rucker, Alabama

Effective dates of promotion

Family
Hokanson is married to Kelly M. (Triplett) Hokanson. They are the parents of three children, daughter Victoria, and sons Daniel Jr. and McKinnon. All three Hokanson children pursued careers in the military.

References

External links

Biography, Daniel R. Hokanson at National Guard Bureau General Officer Management Office
Biography, Daniel R. Hokanson at United States Northern Command

|-

1963 births
Living people
People from Happy Camp, California
People from Keizer, Oregon
Chiefs of the National Guard Bureau
National Guard (United States) generals
United States Army personnel of the Iraq War
United States Army personnel of the War in Afghanistan (2001–2021)
United States Military Academy alumni
American Master Army Aviators
Naval Postgraduate School alumni
Naval War College alumni
Harvard Kennedy School alumni
National Defense University alumni
United States Army generals
Recipients of the Distinguished Service Medal (US Army)
Recipients of the Defense Superior Service Medal
Recipients of the Legion of Merit
Recipients of the Soldier's Medal
Recipients of the Defense Distinguished Service Medal
Military personnel from California
Military personnel from Oregon